Following is a list of senators of Finistère, people who have represented the department of Finistère in the Senate of France.

Third Republic

Senators for Finistère under the French Third Republic were:

 Émile Forsanz (1876-1882)
 François Marie Monjaret de Kerjégu (1876-1882)
 Arnold de Raismes (18761894)
 François Soubigou (1876-1894)
 Hippolyte Halna du Fretay (1882-1893)
 Édouard Le Guen (1882-1894)
 Joseph Astor (1890-1894)
 Louis Delobeau (1893-1912)
 Pierre Drouillard (1894-1895)
 Corentin Halléguen (1894-1899)
 Alexis Savary (1894-1899)
 Armand Rousseau (1895-1896)
 Henri Ponthier de Chamaillard (1897-1908)
 Arsène Lambert (1900-1901)
 Louis Pichon (1900-1916)
 Adolphe Porquier (1901-1903)
 Jules de Cuverville (1901-1912)
 Armand Gassis (1903-1912)
 Jules Fortin (1908-1930)
 Louis Hémon (1912-1914)
 Émile Villiers (1912-1921)
 Maurice Fenoux (1912-1930)
 Louis Le Guillou de Penanros (1914-1920)
 Théodore Le Hars (1920-1928)
 Albert Louppe (1921-1927)
 Ferdinand Lancien (1921-1945)
 Yves Guillemot (1927-1939)
 Georges Le Bail (1928-1937)
 Jules Le Louédec (1930-1931)
 Yves Tanguy (1931-1939)
 Victor Pierre Le Gorgeu (1931-1945)
 Jacques Queinnec (1937-1945)
 François Halna du Fretay (1939-1945)
 Olivier Le Jeune (1939-1945)

Fourth Republic

Senators for Finistère under the French Fourth Republic were:

Albert Jaouen (1946–1948)
Jules Hippolyte Masson (1946–1955)
Antoine Vourc'h (1946–1955)
Yves Jaouen (1946–1959)
Joseph Pinvidic (1948–1951)
Yves Le Bot (1951–1959)
Jean-Louis Rolland (1955–1959)
Xavier Trellu (1955–1959)

Fifth Republic 
Senators for Finistère under the French Fifth Republic:

References

Sources

 
Lists of members of the Senate (France) by department